James Vrij (born August 9, 1951, in Amsterdam, North Holland) is a retired welterweight boxer from the Netherlands, who represented his native country at the 1972 Summer Olympics. There he was eliminated in the second round of the men's welterweight (– 67 kg) division by eventual silver medalist János Kajdi from Hungary.

1972 Olympic results
Below is the record of James Vrij, a Dutch welterweight boxer who competed at the 1972 Munich Olympics:

 Round of 64: bye
 Round of 32: lost to János Kajdi (Hungary) by decision, 1-4

References

External links
  Dutch Olympic Committee

1951 births
Living people
Welterweight boxers
Boxers at the 1972 Summer Olympics
Olympic boxers of the Netherlands
Boxers from Amsterdam
Dutch male boxers